Odinazoda Bakhtiyor is a Tajikistani , arts-crafts artist. Born in Hatlonskaya province in 1964, he graduated from Olimov State Art College (later becoming a lecturer there) in Dushanbe in 1974. After completing his education at the art college in Dushanbe 1983 , he was sent to Tashkent to continue his education. He graduated  from state Institute of Drama and Art, Tashkent in 1990. He has been mostly involved in painting in addition to sculpture and ceramics in small forms. He has been attending, republic, regional and group (in
Dushanbe and abroad) exhibitions. His works are preserved in special collections in United States, Europe and Russia.

References
~

Tajikistani artists
Tajikistani costume designers
Soviet cinematographers
Living people
People from Khujand
Year of birth missing (living people)